Balandchaqir is a village in Jizzakh Region, Uzbekistan. It is the administrative center of Yangiobod District.

References

Populated places in Jizzakh Region